The 1997 WNBA season was the first for the Phoenix Mercury.

Offseason

Initial Player Allocation

WNBA Elite Draft

WNBA Draft

Regular season

Season standings

Season Schedule

Player stats
Note: GP= Games played; FG = Field Goals; MIN= Minutes; REB= Rebounds; AST= Assists; STL = Steals; BLK = Blocks; PTS = Points

Toni Foster ranked ninth in the WNBA in total rebounds with 172
Toni Foster was ranked ninth in the WNBA in steals with 53.  
Toni Foster tied for seventh in the WNBA in blocks with 21. 
Toni Foster ranked seventh in the WNBA in Field Goal Percentage (.468)
Jennifer Gillom ranked tenth in the WNBA in Free Throw Pct with .777
Jennifer Gillom ranked fourth in the WNBA in field goals with 163
Jennifer Gillom ranked fifth in the WNBA in points with 440 points.
Jennifer Gillom ranked fifth in the WNBA in points per game with 15.7
Bridget Pettis was tied for tenth in the WNBA in steals with 49. 
Michele Timms ranked third in the WNBA in minutes per game with 35.8
Michele Timms ranked second in the WNBA in steals with 71.
Michele Timms ranked third in the WNBA in assists with 137. 
Chantel Tremitiere ranked fourth in the WNBA in assists with 135. 
Umeki Webb ranked fourth in the WNBA in steals with 68.

Awards and honors
Jennifer Gillom, Center, All-WNBA Second Team 
 Bridget Pettis: Led WNBA, Free Throw Percentage, .898 
Michele Timms: Third in WNBA, 3-Pt Field Goals, 49

Playoffs
Lost WNBA Semifinals (1-0) to New York Liberty

References

External links 
Mercury on Basketball Reference

Phoenix Mercury seasons
Phoenix
Phoenix Mercury
Western Conference (WNBA) championship seasons